Fairlight II may refer to
Fairlight II (video game), a computer game released by The Edge in 1986
Fairlight CMI Series II, a synthesizer